Chantal Brunel (born 9 September 1948) was the mayor of Bussy-Saint-Georges from 2014 until 2016. She was a member of the National Assembly of France until 2012.  She represented the Seine-et-Marne department. She was a member of the Union for a Popular Movement.

Appointed head of the equality office, she is a staunch supporter of liberalisation of laws against sex work in France.. She is of Greek ancestry.

References

1948 births
Living people
Politicians from Paris
French people of Greek descent
Liberal Democracy (France) politicians
Union for a Popular Movement politicians
Mayors of places in Île-de-France
Women members of the National Assembly (France)
Women mayors of places in France
Deputies of the 12th National Assembly of the French Fifth Republic
Deputies of the 13th National Assembly of the French Fifth Republic
21st-century French women politicians